The 1963–64 Copa México also known as the Copa Presidente Adolfo Lopez Mateo is the 48th staging of the Copa México, a Mexican football cup competition that existed from 1907 to 1997, but the 21st staging in the professional era.

The competition started on February 23, 1964, and concluded on April 21, 1964, with the Final, held at the Estadio Olímpico Universitario in Mexico City, in which América lifted the trophy for the third time ever with a 6-5 victory over Monterrey in penalty kicks.

First round
 América and  Atlas bye to next round

|}

Final round

Semifinals
First Leg

Second Leg

Final

Replay

References
Mexico - Statistics of Copa México in season 1963/1964. (RSSSF)

Copa MX
Cop